Psilogramma tanimbarica is a moth of the  family Sphingidae. It is known from Indonesia.

Subspecies
Psilogramma tanimbarica tanimbarica (Tenimber)
Psilogramma tanimbarica babariensis (Eitschberger, 2010) (Babar Archipelago)

References

Psilogramma
Moths described in 2001
Endemic fauna of Indonesia